Kathrin Cornelia Lang (née Hitzer; born 3 September 1986) is a former German biathlete. Because of her pregnancy by her boyfriend (now husband), biathlete Toni Lang, she finished the 2011/12 season in December 2011.

In her career, Lang won two World Cup races, the pursuit and the mass start in Khanty-Mansiysk in 2008.

She retired after the 2013–14 season, having not been selected for the national team.

References

External links
  
 
 

1986 births
Living people
German female biathletes